They Raid by Night is a 1942 American low-budget World War II film directed by Spencer Gordon Bennet and starring Lyle Talbot and June Duprez. It was from Producers Releasing Corporation.

Plot summary 
The story follows the insertion of British Commandos into Norway to rescue a Norwegian general (Gen. Heden) from captivity and take him to the United Kingdom to lead the Free Norwegian Forces.

The film opens with the execution of a British spy who was sent to support partisan activities. A small team is assembled which consists of Capt. Robert Owen, a Canadian, Sgt. Harry Hall, a British and a Norwegian called Lt. Erik Falken. The team parachutes in and soon after arriving Falken is recognised by a local woman who reports them to her German lover and Dalberg, a Quisling. A team is sent to capture them but after they overpower their captors and free the general from the prison camp they are soon being pursued by the German authorities.

Once on the road in a captured German car they are attacked and forced to take shelter after Heden is hurt. They send Falken to get assistance from a doctor but he is betrayed once again by the same woman whom he had known when growing up in his hometown. The Germans take Falken alive and, pretending to be the doctor they requested, capture Owen near the house they are hiding in. Hall manages to keep Heden in safety in the house.

Owen misleads the Germans about their escape plans and after the Germans have realised their mistake they are surprised to find that the two prisoners have been freed by Dalberg. Owen and Falken manage to return to Hall and Heden and the party moves off to rendezvous with the incoming commandos and Royal Navy boats.

The film includes real footage from British Commando raids on German occupying forces in Norway in March and December of 1941.

Main cast 

Lyle Talbot as Capt. Robert Owen
June Duprez as Inga Beckering
Victor Varconi as Col. Otto von Ritter
George N. Neise as Lt. Erik Falken
Charley Rogers as Sgt. Harry Hall
Paul Baratoff as Maj. Gen. Heden
Leslie Denison as Capt. Ralph Deane
Crane Whitley as Doctor
Sven Hugo Borg as Dalberg
Eric Wilton as Maj. Gen. Lloyd
Pierce Lyden as Braun, Ritter's Aide
John Beck as Mr. Sandling, Beggar
Robert Fischer as Major Von Memel
Sigfrid Tor as German Lieutenant
Brian O'Hara as Lammet, Radio Broadcaster
'Snub' Pollard as Bertie, Messenger / Orderly
Bruce Kellogg as Sentry

External links 
 

Commandos (United Kingdom)
1942 films
1942 drama films
American World War II films
1940s English-language films
American black-and-white films
Producers Releasing Corporation films
World War II films made in wartime
Films set in Norway
Films about Norwegian resistance movement
American drama films
Films directed by Spencer Gordon Bennet